The John W. C. Trowell House in Jesup in Wayne County, Georgia was listed on the National Register of Historic Places in 1993.

It is a Queen Anne-style house built in 1902.  It was home of John W. C. Trowell (b.1862 in Screven County, Georgia, d.1939 in this house) and his wife Ella née Butler (c.1865-1951).

It is now the Trowell Historic Inn Bed & Breakfast.

References

External links
Trowell Historic Inn Bed and Breakfast, official site

Houses on the National Register of Historic Places in Georgia (U.S. state)
Queen Anne architecture in Georgia (U.S. state)
Houses completed in 1902
Wayne County, Georgia